Sueros de Cepeda is a locality and minor local entity located in the municipality of Villamejil, in León province, Castile and León, Spain. As of 2020, it has a population of 239.

Geography 
Sueros de Cepeda is located 44km west of León, Spain.

References

Populated places in the Province of León